Aufeius is a genus of scentless plant bugs in the family Rhopalidae. There is one described species in Aufeius, A. impressicollis.

References

Further reading

External links

Rhopalinae
Articles created by Qbugbot
Pentatomomorpha genera